Mercedes-Benz W202 is the internal designation for a compact sedan/saloon manufactured and marketed by Mercedes-Benz 1993–2000, as the first generation of the C-Class, now in its fifth generation.  Replacing the 190 series/W201 in June 1993, the C-Class sedan was Mercedes' entry-level model until 1997, when the company launched the A-Class. Production reached 1,847,382 over model years 1994–2000.

Background
Development started on a replacement to the 190 series in October 1986, with design work commencing in 1987 under Bruno Sacco. By 1988, the first full-scale models were made, narrowed to two design directions by December 1988.  The design by Olivier Boulay was chosen in 1989 and the production design was frozen in January 1990, subsequently patented on 19 December 1990. Rough prototypes went into testing in 1989, with first production design prototypes commencing testing in 1990.

Engines 

The C-Class debuted with a complete lineup of multi-valve engines. The family of four-cylinder petrol units, called M111, debuted in the C 180 (1.8 L), C 200 (2.0 L,  and C 220 (2.2 L, the only four-cylinder of the range sold in the U.S.). The C 280 was the high-end model of the class, with a four-valve-per-cylinder straight-six engine, capable of reaching .

Four-cylinder diesel models were equipped with the same OM601 engine of the 190, in the 2.0 L and 2.2 L versions. Many of these diesel variants were sold as taxis, due to their low fuel consumption and strong reliability. There were also more powerful OM605 five-cylinder engines which were available in naturally aspired (C 250 D) and turbocharged (C 250 TD) forms. The turbodiesel was introduced in 1995 and is one of the novelties in the engine range available from this year. The most important was a supercharged version of the M111 straight four, the C 230 Kompressor, using a Roots-type supercharger to generate  at 5300 rpm: Mercedes-Benz reused supercharger technology after 50 years. Due to the tax law in Italy and Portugal, models in those countries featured a supercharged version of the smaller 2.0 L (C 200 Kompressor), which had a similar output of the C 230 Kompressor.

The 1997 diesel models featured the OM611, equipped with a common rail direct injection system (co-developed with Bosch). The new model was named C 220 CDI, and had an improved output of  compared with the C 220 Diesel, better fuel average and lower emissions. Also, the inline six engines were replaced by a family of V6, the M112. The new engines featured SOHC heads instead of the previous DOHC, three valves per cylinder instead of four, and twin sparkplugs. The four-cylinder C 230 was replaced by the C 240 (2.4 L) and the I6 C 280 by the V6 C 280. These changes reduced emissions and improved fuel consumption, without sacrificing power (the C 280 in fact had a slight  increase with the change).

In the last four years of production, the W202 received a few changes in the choices of engine. In 1998, a less powerful version of the 2.2 L turbodiesel was added, called C 200 CDI, which replaced the C 220 Diesel.

*Sold in selected markets such as Greece, Italy, Portugal, Turkey, Bulgaria, Croatia, North Macedonia and Hungary

Transmissions 
The original W202 came standard in Germany with a five-speed manual and four-speed automatic transmissions optional. In the United States, automatic transmission was standard, with manual available as a delete option (with few choosing to do so). The four-speed automatic was the 722.4 version of the 4G-TRONIC. In 1996, this old transmission—released in 1981—was replaced by a five-speed automatic, the 722.6 or 5G-TRONIC, which received a manual shift mode in 1999 (722.6). In 2000, with the T-Model only remaining on sale, the RWD C 240 was available with the optional six-speed G56 manual from the W203.

Safety 

At the launch the C-Class had a standard driver airbag, ABS and integrated side-impact protection; the front passenger airbag became standard from 1995 onwards, and from the same period Traction control (ETS in the 4-cylinder models, combined with limited slip differential (ASD) or ASR in the 6 cylinders models) was available as extra cost. In 1997 ASR became standard in the C 280s equipped with the automatic transmission and in the C 36 AMG, as ETS in the 4-cylinder models, except for the C 180 and the C 220 Diesel.

With the 1997 restyling ASR became standard in all the models, except in the C 180 and C 220 Diesel. This last model continued to offer ETS available as extra cost. Moreover, front side airbags and Brake assist (BAS) came in the list of standard safety features. The two basic models finally joined ASR in 1998, and, in 1999, the W202 was the first compact sedan to offer ESP as standard in all the range.

Crash test ratings

AMG models  

In 1995, the C-Class received its first genuine performance model, the C 36 AMG, to counter the new six-cylinder BMW M3. Developed with AMG, the tuning house that had now become a subsidiary of Daimler-Benz, it had racing-tuned suspension (lowered by ) and in the USA, a four-speed automatic gearbox, followed by a standard five-speed automatic gearbox. Only a total of 5200 C36 AMGs were produced.

Unlike the C36, which was in fact a "ready-to-sell" C280 disassembled for tuning at the AMG factory, the C43 was the first AMG car to be completely assembled at the Mercedes factory after the acquisition of AMG by Daimler-Benz in 1998. The C43 AMG can achieve a  time in 5.7 seconds for the saloon version and 5.9 seconds for the estate. The C43 was the first C-Class to be equipped with a Mercedes-Benz V8 engine.

Two versions exist: a saloon (chassis W202.033) and estate also called the "T version" (chassis W202.093). The overall body of the C43 AMG estate version has many similarities with the C36 AMG, except for the front and rear bumpers as well as the side body, both of which were re-designed. The black engine cover with the chrome AMG and Mercedes-Benz star logos is also very typical from that period in this market segment.

Some differences have been reported between the 1998 and the 2000 version such as the ECU software on the 2000 version that seems to provide better gearbox performances and longer life to the gearbox. The 2000 model also gives the ability to power tilt the steering wheel and manually shift with a tiptronic shift gate for all W202's, and AMG stamped letters on the brake calipers (C43 only).

The car was manufactured for a little more than two years – from the end of 1997 to the spring of 2000 for a total of 4,200 units 20% of which are estates and 80% saloons, with only 25 C 43 vehicles of the 2000 model year imported to the US.

The C43 is powered by a tuned version of the 4.3-liter M113 V8 engine originally found on the W210 E 430 model. According to Mercedes-Benz, the car can reach , with electronic speed limitation and  without. Transmission is an AMG-modified version of the five-speed automatic gearbox (722.6) found on 1998–2000 R129 SL 500. Main modifications were made in order to achieve a crisper and better adapted gearbox to higher-rpm upshifts. Also the braking system has been taken from the W210 E 55 AMG.

US-spec models 
W202s in North America included the C220 (later replaced by the C230), C280 (both I6 and V6) and the AMG variants. It was launched in the U.S. in November 1993, and unlike models in Europe, featured a third brake light, no specific trim levels, and side markers integrated into the front-turn signals. The U.S. models also did not have the hazard triangle, which is regularly located in the trunk in case of a road emergency.

The AMG variants also did not ride as low (about an inch higher) as the Euro spec models. The C43 AMG was able to go 155 mph in the U.S. just like the Euro spec models.

Station Wagon Model 

Mercedes-Benz introduced a C-Class station wagon model in 1996, internally designated T-Model (T for tourenwagen – touring car). It shared the same trim levels as the sedan, with the exception of the AMG versions.  The W202 T-model was not made available to the North American market, although the W203 version was.

1996 minor facelift 
On 2 May 1996, German design patents were filed for updates made to the W202 C-Class. The C-Class was subsequently given a minor facelift revised wheel, interior trim, door mouldings, front and rear bumper fascias as well as colour-coded side skirts, darker rear tail light lenses, and a rear windshield integrated radio antenna.  The revised C 200 and C 230 models were fitted with a supercharger with a trunk lid mounted "Kompressor" emblem.

References 

W202
W202
Compact executive cars
Euro NCAP large family cars
Cars introduced in 1993
2000s cars